Cedarian DeLeon "CeeDee" Lamb (born April 8, 1999) is an American football wide receiver for the Dallas Cowboys of the National Football League (NFL). He played college football at Oklahoma where he was a consensus All-American in 2019, and was drafted by the Cowboys in the first round of the 2020 NFL Draft.

Early years
Lamb was born in Opelousas, Louisiana, and lived in New Orleans until he and his family evacuated to Houston, Texas following Hurricane Katrina's effects on the city in 2005. Lamb later attended John and Randolph Foster High School in Richmond, Texas, where he played high school football. As a junior, he caught 57 receptions for 1,082 yards and 11 touchdowns.

As a senior in 2016, Lamb had 98 receptions for 2,032 yards (fourth in state history), 33 receiving touchdowns (tied for second in state history) and three punt returns for touchdowns. Lamb, along with quarterback Alex Ramart, led the team to a 14–1 overall record, with the only loss coming to Temple High School in the 5A-D1 state semifinals. Lamb received All-State, Houston Touchdown Club's Offensive Player of the Year and the Houston Chronicle'''s All-Greater Houston Football Offensive Player of the Year honors.

Lamb was rated a four-star recruit by 247Sports.com, Rivals.com and ESPN, and had offers from schools such as the University of Alabama and University of Texas. He committed to the University of Oklahoma on July 25, 2016.

College career

As a true freshman at Oklahoma in 2017, Lamb caught passes from quarterback Baker Mayfield, who would go on to win the Heisman Trophy. Lamb played in all 14 games, posting 46 receptions (tied for second for freshman) for 807 yards (school freshman record) and seven touchdowns (tied the school freshman record). He set school freshman single-game records with nine receptions for 147 yards and tied the school freshman single-game mark with two touchdown receptions against Texas Tech. He received freshman All-American honors by ESPN.

As a sophomore in 2018, Lamb's starting quarterback was Kyler Murray, who would also go on to win the Heisman Trophy. Lamb was a key contributor in the Sooners 12–2 record and playoff appearance. He played in all 14 games with 13 starts, catching 65 passes for 1,158 yards and 11 touchdowns (led the team). Lamb was also the team's punt returner, registering 17 returns for 218 yards and a 12.8-yard average (second in the Big 12). Lamb recorded five 100-yard receiving games and he and Marquise Brown became the first wide receiver tandem in school history to record 1,000-yard receiving seasons in the same year. He established a career-high with 167 receiving yards on six receptions and scored one touchdown in the Big 12 Championship 39–27 win against #9 Texas. Lamb had a career-high eight receptions for 109 yards and one touchdown against the top ranked Alabama Crimson Tide in the College Football Playoff semifinal at the 2018 Orange Bowl.

As a junior in 2019, Lamb caught passes from quarterback Jalen Hurts, who finished second in the Heisman Trophy voting. He was named a first-team All-American, after catching 62 passes for 1,327 yards and 14 touchdowns. Lamb's 21.4 yards average per reception, was the most ever in a single season by an OU player with at least 50 receptions. He was a finalist for the Biletnikoff Award for best college football receiver. Lamb was named the Most Outstanding Player of the Big 12 Championship, after collecting 173 yards on eight receptions (including a 71-yarder that set up the team's first touchdown) in a 30–23 victory over #7 Baylor. He had four receptions for 119 yards (including a 51-yarder) in the College Football Playoff Semifinal at the 2019 Peach Bowl against #1 Louisiana State University. On December 29, Lamb announced that he would forgo his senior year and enter the 2020 NFL Draft.

College statistics

Professional career

Lamb was selected by the Dallas Cowboys in the first round with the 17th overall pick in the 2020 NFL Draft. He was the third wide receiver selected, behind Henry Ruggs (Las Vegas Raiders, 12th overall) and Jerry Jeudy (Denver Broncos, 15th overall). On July 23, 2020, Lamb signed a 4-year, $14.01 million contract with the team, with a $7.7 million signing bonus and a fifth-year team option.

 2020 season 
Lamb made his NFL debut in the season-opener against the Los Angeles Rams on NBC Sunday Night Football'', recording five receptions for 59 yards in the 20–17 road loss. In the next game against the Atlanta Falcons, Lamb caught six passes for 106 yards, including a 24-yard reception to help set up the Cowboys' game winning field goal during the narrow 40–39 comeback victory. Two weeks later against the Cleveland Browns, Lamb had five receptions for 79 yards and two touchdowns in the 49–38 loss. Playing against the New York Giants in Week 5, he was the number one target at 11 total targets, making eight receptions for 124 yards, in the eventual 37–34 victory. During a Week 9 24-19 loss to the Pittsburgh Steelers, Lamb caught four passes for 71 yards and his third touchdown of the season while also losing his first fumble of his career. During a Week 15 41-33 victory over the San Francisco 49ers, Lamb recorded five catches for 85 yards and returned an onside kick attempt for a 47-yard touchdown. In the next game against the Philadelphia Eagles, Lamb recorded three catches for 65 yards, including a 52-yard touchdown reception, and rushed once for a 19-yard touchdown during the 37–17 victory.

Lamb finished his rookie season with 74 receptions for 935 yards and five touchdowns to go along with 10 carries for 82 yards and a touchdown in 16 games and 14 starts. He finished second to Justin Jefferson among rookies in receiving yards.

2021 season
During the season-opening 31-29 road loss to the Tampa Bay Buccaneers, Lamb had seven receptions for 104 yards and a touchdown. During a Weel 5 44-20 victory over the New York Giants, he caught four passes for 84 yards and a touchdown to go along with a four-yard rush. In the next game against the New England Patriots, Lamb caught the game-winning 35-yard touchdown in overtime, finishing with nine receptions for 149 yards and two touchdowns in the 35-29 overtime road victory. During a Week 10 43-3 victory over Atlanta Falcons, he had six receptions for 94 yards and two touchdowns to go along with a 12-yard carry. During a Week 16 56-14 victory over the Washington Football Team, Lamb caught four passes for 66 yards, giving him his first career 1,000-yard season.

Lamb finished his second professional season with a team-leading 79 receptions for 1,102 yards and six touchdowns (tied for second on the team) in 16 games and 13 starts. He was selected to his first Pro Bowl after the season as a replacement for Cooper Kupp, who participated in Super Bowl LVI. Lamb was ranked 95th by his fellow players on the NFL Top 100 Players of 2022.

2022 season
During a Week 10 31-28 overtime road loss Green Bay Packers, Lamb recorded 11 receptions for 150 yards and two touchdowns. During a Week 15 40-34 overtime road loss to the Jacksonville Jaguars, he had seven receptions for 126 yards. In the next game against the Philadelphia Eagles, he had ten receptions for 120 yards and two touchdowns in the 40–34 victory.

Lamb finished the 2022 season with 107 receptions for 1,359 yards and nine touchdowns, all career-highs, in 17 games and starts. He was named as a Pro Bowler for the second time. Lamb was also named to the AP All-Pro 2nd Team. In the Wild Card Round against the Tampa Bay Buccaneers, he recorded four receptions for 68 yards and his first postseason touchdown in the 31–14 road victory. In the Divisional Round against the San Francisco 49ers, Lamb caught 10 passes for 117 yards.

NFL career statistics

Regular season

Postseason

References

External links

Twitter
Dallas Cowboys bio
Oklahoma Sooners bio

1999 births
Living people
People from Richmond, Texas
Players of American football from Texas
Sportspeople from the Houston metropolitan area
American football wide receivers
Oklahoma Sooners football players
All-American college football players
Dallas Cowboys players
National Conference Pro Bowl players